Wenden Voivodeship was a unit of administrative division and local government in the Duchy of Livonia, part of the Polish–Lithuanian Commonwealth. It was formed in 1598 by King Sigismund III Vasa, out of Wenden Presidency (Province), which had been created in 1582 by King Stephen Báthory, after the Truce of Yam-Zapolsky. The voivodeship remained in the Commonwealth until the Swedish Empire's conquest of Livonia in the 1620s. The unconquered remainder of Livonia was named Inflanty Voivodeship, and continued to be part of the Commonwealth until its first partition in 1772.

Officially, Wenden Voivodeship belonged to Poland–Lithuania until the Treaty of Oliva in 1660. Its capital was Wenden, where local sejmiks of the nobility (see szlachta) took place. Wenden Voivodeship elected two deputies to the Sejm of the Polish–Lithuanian Commonwealth. Even though it no longer belonged to the Commonwealth after the Swedish conquest, its voivodes continued to be named by Polish kings until the final partition of Poland (1795), as the so-called "fictitious titles".

Major cities, towns and castles of Wenden Voivodeship were: Cēsis (Kies, Wenden), Riga, Koknese (Kokenhausen), Salaspils (Kircholm), Daugavpils (Dyneburg), Rēzekne (Rzezyca, Rositten), Viļaka (Marienhausen), Gulbene (Schwanenburg), Ludza (Lucyn), Krustpils (Kreutzburg).

Voivodes of Wenden
The seat of the voivode was Wenden (Cēsis).
1598–1602 Jürgen von Farensbach
1620–1622 Teodor Denhoff
1627–1641 Joachim Tarnowski
1641–1643 Tomasz Sapieha
1643–1648  Gerard Denhoff
(died 1659) Nikolaus Korff

References

Voivodeships of the Polish–Lithuanian Commonwealth
Duchy of Livonia
1598 establishments in the Polish–Lithuanian Commonwealth
1621 disestablishments in the Polish–Lithuanian Commonwealth
States and territories disestablished in the 1620s
Organisations based in Livonia